Anthousa, known before 1927 as Rapeza, is a village in the Preveza regional unit of Epirus, in western Greece. In 2011 its population was 621 for the village and 677 for the community, which includes the village Trikorfo. Anthousa is in the municipality of Parga. Anthousa is situated 3 km northwest of the town Parga, under a Turkish castle on a hill, attributed to Ali Pasha. Remains and coins of the ancient city of Elaia have been found near the village.

History
Tombs of the Hellenistic and Roman era have been unearthed in the area of the municipal unit of Anthousa. In the 12th century the monastery of Virgin Mary of Vlacherna was erected. Traces of a Venetian garrison are also visible.

At the beginning of 19th century the Ottoman ruler Ali Pasha built a castle over Anthousa in order to plan a siege against nearby Parga. 

Anthousa was one of the Christian Orthodox Albanian-speaking villages, which either due to the absence of Greek or for reasons of demographic importance, would see Greek education expanded through measures such as the establishment of kindergartens.

In Anthousa and also Kanallaki, the closest existing variants of Souliotic Albanian are spoken. This dialect is spoken only by few people in modern times.

Population

References

Sources

External links
 Anthousa GTP Travel Pages

Populated places in Preveza (regional unit)
Albanian communities in Greece